The Product G&B is an American R&B duo made up of David McRae (also known as Sincere Gubano) and Marvin Moore-Hough (also known as Money Harm). They were associated with Wyclef Jean's The Refugee Camp.

Since their debut in 1998, the duo lent their vocals to several tracks on Pras' Ghetto Supastar album, including the single "Blue Angels".

Wyclef Jean convinced Arista Records chief Clive Davis to release "Maria Maria", the duo's collaboration with Carlos Santana, as a single, which contributed to Santana's Supernatural album eventually selling over 30 million copies worldwide. The song became a worldwide number-one hit. "Maria Maria" was named the third most successful song of the year on the Billboard Hot 100. The song also won a Grammy Award in 2000. The duo also released the singles, "Cluck Cluck", "Dirty Dancin'", and the 50 Cent-featured single "I'm Tired of Being Broke". 

In 2009, they were featured on Squala Orphan's song "U Don't Know" from the album Unheard Cries. The song "V.I.P." hit the charts in different European countries.

On May 23, 2014, they released in Europe together with DJ Mr. Da-Nos an extended play called Summer Nights in Brazil, by Universal Music and they were nominated for Best Swiss Act at the 2014 MTV Europe Music Awards.

Discography
2001: Ghetto & Blues

References

People from Hempstead (village), New York
American contemporary R&B musical groups
American musical duos
Contemporary R&B duos